Casali is an Italian surname. Notable people with the surname include:

Andrea Casali (1705–1784), Italian painter
Arianna Farfaletti Casali (born 1976), former Italian-born Swiss female pole vaulter
Charles Casali (1923–2014), Swiss footballer
Curt Casali (born 1988), American baseball player
Giovanni Battista Casali (1715–1792), Italian musician
Giovanni Battista Casali del Drago (1838–1908), Italian cardinal
Giovanni di Casali, Italian mathematician and theologian
Giovanni Battista Casali (1715–1792), Italian musician
Giulio Casali (born 1932), Sammarinese professional football player and manager
Italo Casali (born 1940), Sammarinese former sports shooter
Kim Casali (1941–1997), New Zealand cartoonist
Casali brothers, Dario and Milo Casali
Libero Casali (born 1939), Sammarinese former sports shooter
Marco Casali (born 1966), Chilean Crossfit Athlete
Paolo Casali. Italian-American academic and immunologist
Stefano Casali (born 1962), Sammarinese racewalker
Tino Casali (born 1995), Austrian football player

See also
 Casale (disambiguation)
Casalis (sometimes plural casali), a medieval settlement type

Italian-language surnames